Winchfield Green is a hamlet in the civil parish of Winchfield in Hampshire, England. Its nearest town is Fleet, which lies approximately 2 miles (3 km) east to the hamlet.

Villages in Hampshire